Khadra Haji Ismail Geid is a Somali politician. In 2011, she became the mayor of Gabiley City, and the first woman mayor in Somaliland. She is today the Vice Mayor of Gabiley.

Career
Geid joined the ruling Peace, Unity, and Development Party Party in 2002. In May 2011, she was approved by the Interior Minister as Mayor of Gabiley District. Geid is the district's seventh Mayor since 1991 and the first woman to serve in this capacity in the Somaliland region. Before being elected to the position, she served four years as council member and six years as Vice Mayor.

Geid was removed from office by a vote of no confidence at the Gabiley city council on 13 March 2012 and re-elected Vice Mayor.

References

Living people
Somaliland politicians
Peace, Unity, and Development Party politicians
Year of birth missing (living people)
Political office-holders in Somaliland
Somaliland women in politics
People from Maroodi Jeex